The Letterman Foundation for Courtesy and Grooming (LFCG) is a private foundation whose president and primary contributor is David Letterman.  The foundation's treasurer is Fred Nigro, who has appeared on Late Show with David Letterman where he has been identified as Letterman's accountant.  The foundation operates out of Nigro's Los Angeles, California offices.

History
LFCG was founded in August 1993 as The DL Foundation; since at least 2001, LFCG had been known as the American Foundation for Courtesy and Grooming, the name it had had when it assumed its current name in 2011.

According to LFCG's tax returns (Form 990-PF), made available by the Foundation Center, for the years from 2001 through 2011, LFCG donated a total of over $9.2 million to various foundations and other organizations.

During 2005, the net proceeds from online purchases of Explod-O-Pop Popcorn benefited LFCG.

Recipients

The following is a partial list of organizations receiving grants from the foundation, based on tax forms from 2001 through 2004, available via The Foundation Center.

Indianapolis-based organizations
The largest LFCG beneficiary by far is Child Advocates of Indianapolis, Indiana, a CASA affiliate — from 2001 through 2004, the organization received donations each year of between $194,000 – $290,000, with a four-year total of nearly $950,000 (over a third of LFCG's total contributions during those years).  Other recipients in Indianapolis include:
Broad Ripple Haverford Little League
Broad Ripple High School (Letterman's alma mater)
Damar Services
Marion County Children's Guardian Home
Indianapolis Art Center
Indiana Historical Society
Indiana School for the Deaf
Little Red Door Cancer Agency
Nineveh-Hensley-Jackson United School (in nearby Trafalgar)
Protective Order Pro Bono Project
Riley Children's Foundation
Special Olympics of Indiana
University of Indianapolis Center for Aging and Community

Montana-based organizations
LFCG has donated to various organizations in Montana, including:
Choteau AYSO Soccer
Choteau High School
 Choteau Youth Special Olympics
Montana Wilderness Association
Montana State 4-H Horse Show
The Nature Conservancy of Montana
Special Olympics
Teton Medical Center Foundation of Choteau
Yellowstone Valley Cycling Club of Billings

Universities
LFCG has donated to several universities:
Ball State University (Letterman's alma mater)
Butler University
Case Western Reserve University
Cornell University
Rutgers University

Celebrity-affiliated organizations
LFCG has contributed to various foundations associated with celebrities, including:
Earnhardt Family Foundation
Michael J. Fox Foundation
The Larry King Cardiac Foundation
Paul Newman's Hole in the Wall Gang Camp

Other organizations
Other recipients include:

American Cancer Society
American Foundation for Suicide Prevention
American Red Cross
Being Kind of New York City
Bennett Cancer Center of Stamford, Connecticut
Breast Cancer Foundation
The Buckley School Parents Association
Congregation Beit Simchat Torah of New York City
Connecticut State Police Academy Alumni Association
Crohn's and Colitis Foundation of America
Doctors without Borders
Friends of Karen of North Salem, New York
Giving Back Fund of California
Holy Trinity Orthodox Church of Danbury, Connecticut
Juvenile Diabetes Research Foundation
New York-Presbyterian Hospital
North Salem Free Library
North Salem Open Land Foundation
North Salem Voluntary Ambulance Center
Martha's Vineyard Hospital
Martha's Vineyard Historical Society
A Place Called Home of South Central Los Angeles
Retinitis Pigmentosa International
Silver Shield Association of Greenwich, Connecticut
Salvation Army
Seattle University Mexico Mission
Shoes That Fit of Claremont, California
World Vision

References

External links 
Treasurer Fred Nigro's appearance in the April 12, 1996 edition of the Top 10 List from The Late Show, archived from the original on 2002-05-28
Treasurer Fred Nigro's appearance on the January 14, 2002 episode of The Late Show, archived from the original on 2006-06-27  

David Letterman
Foundations based in the United States
Organizations established in 1993